LHS 2924, also commonly known as LP 271-25, is an extremely small and dim ultra-cool red dwarf located in the constellation of Boötes, about 35.85 light years from the Sun. It is very challenging to see LHS 2924 from Earth, because it is so extremely faint, having an apparent magnitude in the visible spectrum of only +19.35. Due to its faintness, it was only discovered in 1983, and it was the least massive star known at the time of its discovery, being smaller and less luminous than VB 10, which was before LHS 2924’s discovery the least massive and luminous star known. LHS 2924 is the primary standard for the M9V spectral class.

See also
 2MASS J0523-1403
 EBLM J0555-57

References 

M-type main-sequence stars
Boötes
3849